Solidago velutina, the threenerve goldenrod or velvety goldenrod, is a plant species native to Mexico and to the western United States. The species has been found in southwestern Oregon, east to the Black Hills of South Dakota, and as far south as México State in the central part of the Republic of México. It is classified as a member of Subsection Nemorales.

Recent taxonomic treatments have expanded the concept of S. velutina to include S. californica and S. sparsiflora, long considered by many to be distinct species. These are now often treated as subspecies:

Solidago velutina subsp. californica (Nutt.) Semple - California, Oregon
Solidago velutina subsp. sparsiflora (A.Gray) Semple

Another infraspecific taxon is also recognized by some authors:

Solidago velutina var. nevadensis (A. Gray) C.E.S. Taylor & R.J. Taylor

Description
Solidago velutina has a basal rosette of leaves that are still present at flowering time. The leaves get progressively smaller higher up on the stem. Each leaf has three prominent veins running from the base to near the tip. One plant can produce as many as 500 small yellow flower heads in a large, branching array at the top of the plant.

References

External links
Photo of herbarium specimen at University of Texas Herbarium, collected in Coahuila in 1995

velutina
Plants described in 1836
Flora of the United States
Flora of Mexico